George Washington Morey (9 January 1888, Minneapolis, Minnesota – 3 October 1965, Bethesda, Maryland) was an American geochemist, physical chemist, mineralogist, and petrologist, known for the "Morey bomb" used in hydrothermal research.

Biography
Morey studied chemistry at the University of Minnesota with a bachelor's degree in 1909 and was a member of the Geophysical Laboratory of Carnegie Institution in Washington, D.C., from 1912 until his retirement in 1953. He was Acting Director of the Laboratory from 1952 to 1953 before Philip H. Abelson replaced him.

He focused on experimental investigations of phase equilibria and thermodynamics of silicate melts with volatile components, such as water and carbon dioxide. In both WW I and WW II, Morey, as an expert on glass, was involved in the Laboratory's optical glassmaking projects for military equipment, such as rangefinders and gunsights.

Morey received in 1926 the Hillebrand Prize by the Chemical Society of Washington, in 1948 the first Arthur L. Day Medal, and in 1959 the Howard N. Potts Medal (for high refractive index, low dispersion optical glass). He was elected a Fellow of the Geological Society of America, the British Society of Glass Technology, and the American Ceramic Society, which awards a George W. Morey Award for glass technology.

Selected publications
 with Clarence Norman Fenner: The ternary system H2O-K2SiO3-SiO2, Journal of the American Chemical Society, Vol. 40, 1917, pp. 49–59 
 A comparison of the heating-curve and quenching methods of melting point determinations, Journal of the Washington Academy of Sciences, Volume 13, 1923, pp. 326–329 
 with Norman L. Bowen: The melting relations of soda-lime-silica glasses, Transactions of the Society of Glass Technology, Vol. 9, 1925, pp. 226–264
 The Composition of Glass, The Scientific Monthly, Vol. 42, 1936, pp. 541–554 
 The Properties of Glass, American Chemical Monograph Series, Reinhold, New York, 1938.

References

American mineralogists
American geochemists
Fellows of the Geological Society of America
Howard N. Potts Medal recipients
1888 births
1965 deaths